Tetranema is a genus of flowering plants in the family Plantaginaceae, native to Mexico and Central America. There has been some taxonomic debate over its family placement, with Gesneriaceae and Scrophulariaceae having been proposed.

Species
Currently accepted species include:

Tetranema evoluta Donn.Sm.
Tetranema floribundum Hammel & Grayum
Tetranema gamboanum Grayum & Hammel
Tetranema megaphyllum (Brandegee) L.O.Williams
Tetranema michaelfayanum Christenh.
Tetranema roseum (M.Martens & Galeotti) Standl. & Steyerm.

References

Plantaginaceae genera
Plantaginaceae